Aghol Beyk-e Olya (also Romanized as Āghol Beyk-e ‘Olyā; also known as Aghalbak, Aqalbak Bāla, Ogholbeyg-e Bālā, Ogholbeyk-e- ‘Olyā, Oghūl Beyg-e Bālā, Oghulbeyn, Owghlī Beyg-e ‘Olyā, and Owghol Beyg-e Bālā) is a village in Ijrud-e Bala Rural District, in the Central District of Ijrud County, Zanjan Province, Iran. At the 2006 census, its population was 949, in 232 families.

References 

Populated places in Ijrud County